Alfred Sankoh (born 22 October 1988) is a Sierra Leonean footballer who is currently plays for NSÍ Runavík.

Career

Club
Sankoh began training with Strømsgodset in May 2008, going on to sign permanently for the club in July of the same year. In July 2012, Sankoh signed a three-year contract with TFF First League side Şanlıurfaspor. Two years later, in July 2014, Sankoh moved to Khazar Lankaran, signing a two-year contract.

International
Sankoh made his debut for Sierra Leone in a 0-0, 2012 Africa Cup of Nations qualifier, draw against South Africa on 10 October 2010.

Career statistics

Club

International

Statistics accurate as of match played 19 July 2014

References

External links
 

1988 births
Living people
Sierra Leonean footballers
Sierra Leone international footballers
Sierra Leonean expatriate footballers
Gambia Ports Authority FC players
Ullern IF players
Strømsgodset Toppfotball players
Denizlispor  footballers
Şanlıurfaspor footballers
Balıkesirspor footballers
Khazar Lankaran FK players
Al-Jabalain FC players
Majees SC players
Notodden FK players
NSÍ Runavík players
Eliteserien players
TFF First League players
Saudi First Division League players
Oman Professional League players
Azerbaijan Premier League players
Norwegian First Division players
Association football midfielders
Expatriate footballers in the Gambia
Expatriate footballers in Norway
Expatriate footballers in Turkey
Expatriate footballers in Azerbaijan
Expatriate footballers in Oman
Expatriate footballers in Saudi Arabia
Expatriate footballers in the Faroe Islands
Sierra Leonean expatriate sportspeople in Norway
Sierra Leonean expatriate sportspeople in Saudi Arabia
Sierra Leonean expatriate sportspeople in Turkey